Feng Xiaogang (born 18 March 1958 in Beijing) is a Chinese film director, screenwriter, actor, producer and politician. He is well known in China as a highly successful commercial filmmaker whose comedy films do consistently well at the box office, although Feng has broken out from that mold by making some drama and period drama films. Feng was a member of the 12th National Committee of the CPPCC.

Biography
The son of a college professor and a factory nurse, Feng joined the Beijing Military Region Art Troupe as a stage designer after high school. He began his cinema career as an art designer in the Beijing Television Art Center in 1985. Later, he moved on to write screenplays. During this period, he worked closely with director Zheng Xiaolong and writer Wang Shuo.

In the late 1990s, Feng established himself in a Chinese genre called "Hesui Pian (贺岁片)", or "New Year's Celebration Films." He became famous as the director of the movie The Dream Factory (1997). Professor Ying Zhu, an expert in Chinese cinema calls Feng's films 'talk of the nation' for their ability to check the pulse of Chinese society."
Jason McGrath, a University of Minnesota professor, believed that, having achieved success within mainland China in the face of Hollywood competition, "The entertainment cinema of Feng Xiaogang represents a new model of a Chinese national cinema that positions itself vis-à-vis Hollywood."

Feng is renowned for making comedies in the Beijing dialect. Almost all of his films star Ge You in a leading role. In recent years, he has transitioned from solely making comedies to directing drama and period drama movies.

He married actress Xu Fan in 1999.

Filmography

As director

As writer

As actor

References

External links
 
 

 

1958 births
Living people
Male actors from Beijing
Film directors from Beijing
Chinese film producers
Screenwriters from Beijing
Chinese male film actors
Asia Pacific Screen Award winners
Members of the 12th Chinese People's Political Consultative Conference
Members of the 13th Chinese People's Political Consultative Conference